(1308 – August 12, 1335) was a Japanese prince and monk.

He was the son of Emperor Go-Daigo and his consort Minamoto no Chikako.

Moriyoshi was named by his father as the head abbot of the Enryaku-ji temple on Mount Hiei.

Go-Daigo attempted to seize power in 1331 during the Genkō War. Prince Moriyoshi joined forces with Kusunoki Masashige. Moriyoshi tenaciously defended Mount Yoshino. Masashige's heroics defending Chihaya, together with Moriyoshi's efforts to rally troops, brought a large number of warriors to the loyalist cause. By 1333, the rival warlords Ashikaga Takauji and Nitta Yoshisada had both joined the cause; Yoshisada would lay siege to Kamakura in the same year. When the city finally fell, Regent Hōjō Takatoki fled to Tōshō temple, where he and his entire family committed suicide. This marked the end of Hōjō power.

Restored to the throne, Go-Daigo started the Kenmu Restoration. After refusing to appoint Ashikaga Takauji to the post of sei-i taishōgun, Go-Daigo gave it to Prince Morinaga instead. Go-Daigo made the double mistake of giving the title to his sons Moriyoshi and Norinaga, two civilians, thus alienating Takauji and the warrior class, who felt he, as a military man and a descendant of the Minamoto clan, should have been shōgun instead.

Takauji seized Moriyoshi in Yoshino "on imperial warrant", after rumors attributed to Go-Daigo's consort Renshi, that he was preparing an attack. Moriyoshi was then sent to Takauji's brother Ashikaga Tadayoshi in Kamakura. Tadayoshi had Moriyoshi beheaded in late August 1335.

Morinaga’s wife Princess Hinaturu and his vassal took back Morinaga's head to Yamanashi.
Morinaga's head was buried at the base of the katsura tree at Fujisan-Simomiya-Omuro-Sengen-Shrine.

A Shinto shrine, Kamakura-gū, was built around the cave where Prince Moriyoshi was imprisoned. It was dedicated to him by Emperor Meiji in 1869.

Family
 Father: Emperor Go-Daigo
 Mother: Minamoto no Chikako
 Wife: daughter of Kitabatake Moronaga
 Child: Prince Okinaga (b. 1326)

See also
 Kamakura-gū
 Myōhō–ji

References

Further reading
 A Guide to Kamakura, Kamakura-gū, retrieved on June 21, 2008
 
 

1308 births
1335 deaths
14th-century Japanese people
14th-century shōguns
Japanese princes
Shōguns
Genkō War
14th-century executions
People executed by Japan by decapitation
Deified Japanese people
Kamakura period Buddhist clergy
Japanese Buddhist monarchs
Sons of emperors